Alexander Mercury (born 5 September 1983) is a bilingual British actor and film director of Russian origin.

Early life 
Alexander attended primary school in Krasnoyarsk (Siberia), secondary school (a French lycée) - in Moscow and received higher education in London. He trained as an actor at the London Academy of Music and Dramatic Art (2003–2006) together with Luke Treadaway, Harry Treadaway, Emily Beecham and Harry Haddon-Paton.

Career 
Upon graduation, Alexander was cast as a Tartar Officer in a family fantasy film The Golden Compass (2007). In Frankenstein's Army (2013) he portrayed Dimitri. Most recent projects are the TV-series Londongrad (2015) for the Russian entertainment channel STS in which he plays Marcus Stapleton, a British diplomat, and Okkupert (2015), a Norwegian political thriller TV-series based on an idea by Jo Nesbø, which was filmed on location in  Norway.

In 2014, together with a London-based writer Juja Dobrachkous, Alexander adapted an original story called 'Mama" into a short film script 'Mama – Saint Sebastian'. The film was shot on location over 10 days in St. Petersburg and Moscow in early 2015. Post-production was completed in March 2016. The picture was awarded Best Script Prize at St. Anne's Film Festival, Master of Emotions (Golden Anteater) at Lublin Film Festival, Special Jury Prize at VKRATZE Film Festival and screened at over 25 film festivals around the world including the prestigious London Short Film Festival.

Selected filmography

Film
 The Golden Compass (2007) - Tartar Officer
 Material Drive (2012) - Gustav
 Frankenstein's Army (2013) - Dimitri / Wall Zombot #4 - Legs
 Jack Ryan: Shadow Recruit (2014) - Waiter
 Sex, Coffee and Cigarettes (2014) - Photographer 
 Wonder Woman (2017) - German Lieutenant
 The Hitman's Bodyguard (2017) - Hacker Merc

Television
 Londongrad (2015) - Marcus Stapleton
 McMafia (2018) - Russian Functionary

Video games
  Subnautica: Below Zero (2019) - Serik Jevov (voice, cut character)

References

External links 
 
 Personal website
 Alexander Mercury on KinoPoisk
 Showreel on Vimeo
 Interview with WestLondonLiving, 2017

1983 births
Living people
Actors from Krasnoyarsk
Russian male film actors
Russian male television actors
Russian expatriates in the United Kingdom